Locy Baker (born November 19, 1945) is an American politician who served in the Alabama House of Representatives from the 85th district from 1994 to 2010.

References

1945 births
Living people
Democratic Party members of the Alabama House of Representatives